Certified Bulgarian historiography dates back to the 17th century.

In principle, the terms Bulgarian Historiography and Historiography of Bulgaria overlap, given that until the liberation of Bulgaria there are only two stories (the first of Bulgaria and the second of Bulgarians) written by foreign authors – Blasius Kleiner (1761) and on Konstantin Jireček (1876).

Bulgaria and the Bulgarians are widely attested in medieval chronicles and writings, but their thematic independent history is absent until the 17th century. The first major work concerning Bulgarian history is the Kingdom of the Slavs. It serves to support many other works.

From 1667 dates the first independent Bulgarian history of Petar Bogdan, which is entitled „About the antiquity of the father land and the Bulgarian affairs". It is debatable whether it was printed in Venice at all, but this story remains without any social significance. The author is Bulgarian but a Catholic missionary. It was not until the next 18th century when with the Enlightenment and the rise of nationalism in Europe was composed the so-called „Istoriya Slavyanobolgarskaya", which played a huge role and was of fundamental importance for Bulgarian historiography.

Bulgarian historiography on a scientific basis was placed only in the 19th century before the liberation of Bulgaria. The main credit for this is due to two authors – Spiridon Palauzov with his „Century of the Bulgarian Tsar Simeon", ie. The Golden Age of medieval Bulgarian culture (1852) and Konstantin Jireček with his „History of the Bulgarians" (1876).

References

Further reading
 Cicek, Nazan. "'Bulgarian Horrors' Revisited: The Many-Layered Manifestations of the Orientalist Discourse in Victorian Political Construction of the External, Intimate and Internal Other." Belleten 81.291 (2017): 525–568. online
 Dimitrov, Georgi. "Bulgarian Society at the Turn of the 21st Century–a Cognitive Challenge: 30 Years after the Collapse of Communism." Southeastern Europe 44.2 (2020): 105–129. online

 Elenkov, Ivan, and Daniela Koleva. "Historiography in Bulgaria After the Fall of Communism: Did 'The Change' Happen?." Historein 4 (2003): 183–198 online.
 Genchev, Nikolay. "The Quest for Identity" East Europe. (1967) 16#1 pp 20–22.
 Millman, Richard. "The Bulgarian massacres reconsidered." Slavonic and East European Review 58.2 (1980): 218–231. online
 Riis, Carsten. Religion, politics, and historiography in Bulgaria (Columbia Univ. Press, 2002).

 Whitehead, Cameron Ean Alfred. "The Bulgarian Horrors: culture and the international history of the Great Eastern Crisis, 1876–1878" (PhD  Diss. University of British Columbia, 2014) online.

Historiography of Bulgaria